Akkarapol Meesawat (born August 8, 1991) is a Thai professional footballer.

References

External links
 Goal.com

1991 births
Living people
Akkarapol Meesawat
Akkarapol Meesawat
Association football forwards
Akkarapol Meesawat
Akkarapol Meesawat
Akkarapol Meesawat
Akkarapol Meesawat
Akkarapol Meesawat
Akkarapol Meesawat